Jonathan James Chimier (born 6 August 1982) is a Mauritian long jumper who won the 2004 African Championships in Athletics.

His personal best jump is 8.28 metres, achieved while competing in the 2004 Summer Olympics. This is the Mauritian record. He is also a sprinter and competes mainly in the 60 metres. He holds the Mauritian record in the event with a time of 6.68 seconds ahead of Stephan Buckland's 6.72.

Achievements

Personal Bests

References

External links
 

1982 births
Living people
Mauritian male long jumpers
Mauritian male sprinters
Athletes (track and field) at the 2000 Summer Olympics
Athletes (track and field) at the 2004 Summer Olympics
Olympic athletes of Mauritius
Athletes (track and field) at the 2002 Commonwealth Games
Commonwealth Games competitors for Mauritius